Csaba Szűcs (born 29 January 1965 in Kiskunfélegyháza, Bács-Kiskun) is a retired Hungarian athlete, who specialized in the long-distance running events. He represented his native Eastern European country at the 1992 Summer Olympics in Barcelona, Spain, where he did not finish the race.

He was the winner of the 1989 Italian Marathon and also won the Lille Marathon in 1993. He was selected for the Hungarian team at the 1990 European Athletics Championships and finished in ninth place in the marathon.

Personal best
Marathon — 2.12.10 (1993)

Achievements

References
sports-reference

Futanet.hu
Futas.net

1965 births
Living people
People from Kiskunfélegyháza
Hungarian male long-distance runners
Athletes (track and field) at the 1992 Summer Olympics
Olympic athletes of Hungary
Sportspeople from Bács-Kiskun County
20th-century Hungarian people